Salute to the Streetz is a compilation album by rappers Young Buck and Savion Saddam that was released for digital download June 1, 2012 through Ca$hville Records and CPK Musik.

Background 
Young Buck joins forces with Kinston, NC's Savion Saddam to drop a collaboration album.

The first singles were released on September 17, 2011 along with the music videos to the songs "Birdshit" & "My City".

On May 9, 2012 Savion Saddam released four tracks including the intro "Salute" off the album via his official Twitter account. He also indicated that the album contained 14 tracks in whole and is set to drop June 1, 2012.

Track listing

References

2012 albums
Hip hop compilation albums
Young Buck albums